Lawson Suburban Development Area (SDA) is an area in Saskatoon, Saskatchewan (Canada).  It is a part of the west side community of Saskatoon.  It lies (generally) south of the outskirts of the North West Industrial SDA, west of the South Saskatchewan River and the University Heights SDA, north of the Core Neighbourhoods SDA, and east of the North West Industrial SDA.

Neighbourhoods

Recreation facilities
 Lawson Civic Centre
 Saskatoon Kinsmen / Henk Ruys Soccer Centre – Indoor Facility
 Umea Park Soccer Field
 Umea Vast Park Soccer Field

Shopping

 Mall at Lawson Heights

Education 

Lawson SDA is home to the following schools:

Separate education

Secondary schools
 Bishop James Mahoney High School

Elementary schools
 St. George School
 St. Michael School
 École St. Paul School
 St. Anne School
 St. Angela School
 Sister O'Brien School

Public education

Secondary schools
 Marion M. Graham Collegiate
Secondary Schools of Saskatoon

Elementary schools
 Lawson Heights School
 École River Heights School
 Mayfair School
 North Park Wilson School
 Brownell School
 Silverwood Heights School

Library
 Rusty Macdonald Branch Library
 Hector Trout Manor

Transportation

City transit

The following routes service the area, all meeting at the bus terminal at The Mall at Lawson Heights.
 12 River Heights – Stonebridge
 13 Lawson – Exhibition
 14 North Industrial – City Centre
 70 Lawson Heights – Silverspring
 80 Silverwood Heights – Erindale/Arbor Creek

References

External links 
 City of Saskatoon City of Saskatoon · Departments · Community Services · City Planning · ZAM Maps
 Populace Spring 2006

Neighbourhoods in Saskatoon